The men's 4 × 100 metre medley relay competition at the 2006 Pan Pacific Swimming Championships took place on August 20 at the Saanich Commonwealth Place.  The last champion was the United States.

Records
Prior to this competition, the existing world and Pan Pacific records were as follows:

Results
All times are in minutes and seconds.

Final 
This event was a timed-final with two heats. The final was held on August 20, at 20:40.

References

4 × 100 metre medley relay
2006 Pan Pacific Swimming Championships